The following companies have been known as Boston and Worcester, running between the towns of Boston and Worcester, Massachusetts:

Boston and Worcester Railroad
Boston and Worcester Street Railway
Its holding company, Boston and Worcester Electric Companies
Boston and Worcester Turnpike